Robert Milner Coerver (born June 6, 1954) is an American prelate of the Roman Catholic Church, serving as the bishop for the Diocese of Lubbock since 2016.

Biography

Early life 
Robert Coerver was born on June 6, 1954, in Dallas, Texas. He  earned a Licentiate in Spiritual Theology from the Pontifical Gregorian University in Rome.  He also received a Master of Counseling and Guidance degree from Texas A & M University—Commerce in Commerce, Texas.

Priesthood 
On June 27, 1980, Coerver was ordained to the priesthood by Bishop Thomas Ambrose Tschoepe for the Diocese of Dallas. After his ordination, Coerver served as assistant pastor at Saint Elizabeth of Hungary Parish in Dallas, Texas and at Saint Elizabeth Seton Parish in Plano, Texas. He was appointed as director of spiritual formation at Holy Trinity Seminary on the campus of the University of Dallas, holding that position for 11 years.

Coerver was appointed as spirituality consultant to diocesan programs in 1996. In July 1997, he was also named director of the Office of Sacramental Life for the diocese.  In 2003, Coerver was appointed director of priestly life and ministry.

In December 2004, Pope John Paul II named Coerver a prelate of honor with the title "monsignor." In 2005, Coerver began serving as pastoral administrator at Our Lady of the Lake Parish in Rockwall Texas, becoming pastor there in 2006. He was transferred in July 2010 to serve as pastor of St. Rita Parish in Dallas.

Bishop of Lubbock 
Pope Francis appointed Coerver as bishop of the Diocese of Lubbock on September 27, 2016. He was installed and consecrated by Archbishop Gustavo Garcia-Siller at Christ the King Cathedral in Lubbock on November 21, 2016.

On January 21, 2019, Coerver released a list of clerics with credible accusations of sexual abuse. One name on that list was that of Jesus Guerrero, a retired deacon who had been accused in 1997 and 2007 of having an inappropriate relationship with an adult female parishioner alleged to have mental problems.  Guerrero sued the diocese in March 2019 for defamation, saying that he had never been accused of sexual abuse with a minor.  When the state court refused to dismiss the case, the diocese appealed the decision to the Texas Supreme Court.  The court dismissed Guerrero's lawsuit in June 2021, citing the First Amendment rights under the US Constitution of churches to manage their own affairs.

See also

 Catholic Church hierarchy
 Catholic Church in the United States
 Historical list of the Catholic bishops of the United States
 List of Catholic bishops of the United States
 Lists of patriarchs, archbishops, and bishops

References

External links
Roman Catholic Diocese of Lubbock Official Site

1954 births
Living people
Clergy from Dallas
Catholics from Texas
21st-century Roman Catholic bishops in the United States
Bishops appointed by Pope Francis